Gail Keddie (born around 1955) is a British former competitive figure skater from Paisley, Scotland. She is the 1975 British national champion. Keddie competed at two World and two European Championships. Her best result was 14th at the 1974 World Championships in Munich.

Competitive highlights

References 

British female single skaters
Living people
Sportspeople from Paisley, Renfrewshire
Scottish female single skaters
1955 births